The Japanese destroyer {{nihongo|Yomogi|薄|}} was one of 21 s built for the Imperial Japanese Navy (IJN) in the late 1910s. In 1940, she was converted to Patrol Boat No. 38.

Design and description
The Momi class was designed with higher speed and better seakeeping than the preceding  second-class destroyers. Yomogi was powered by two Zoelly geared steam turbines, each driving one propeller shaft using steam provided by three Kampon water-tube boilers. Their crew consisted of 110 officers and crewmen.

The main armament of the Momi-class ships consisted of three  Type 3 guns in single mounts; one gun forward of the well deck, one between the two funnels, and the last gun atop the aft superstructure. The guns were numbered '1' to '3' from front to rear. The ships carried two above-water twin sets of  torpedo tubes; one mount was in the well deck between the forward superstructure and the bow gun and the other between the aft funnel and aft superstructure.

In 1940, Yomogi was converted into a patrol boat. Her torpedo tubes, minesweeping gear, and aft 12 cm gun were removed in exchange for two triple mounts for license-built  Type 96 light AA guns and 60 depth charges.

Construction and career
Yomogi, built at the Ishikawajima shipyard in Tokyo, was laid down on February 26, 1921, launched on March 14, 1922, and completed on August 19, 1922. In 1940, she was Converted to Patrol Boat No.38 (第三十八号哨戒艇, Dai-38-Gō shōkaitei) on April 1, 1940: It was torpedoed in the Bashi Strait by USS Atule on November 25, 1944, and was struck from the naval list on March 10, 1945.

Notes

References

1922 ships
Ships built by IHI Corporation
Momi-class destroyers
Destroyers sunk by aircraft
Ships sunk by US aircraft
Maritime incidents in July 1944
World War II shipwrecks in the Pacific Ocean